George Biller Jr. (February 25, 1874 – October 22, 1915) was Missionary Bishop of South Dakota, serving from 1912 to 1915.

Early life and education
Biller was born in London, England on February 25, 1874, to George Biller and Clara E. Smith. In 1887, he emigrated to the United States. He was educated at St Austin's School in New York City, and then at the Berkeley Divinity School, from where he graduated in 1898.

Ordained Ministry
Biller was ordained deacon on June 5, 1898, by Bishop Thomas A. Starkey of Newark. He at once left to minister in the Oklahoma territory, and was ordained priest on December 21, 1898, by Bishop Francis Key Brooke of Oklahoma. While in Oklahoma, he was also chaplain at All Saints' Hospital in McAlester, Oklahoma. He remained in Oklahoma for five years, until 1903, when he became vicar of the Church of the Incarnation in New York City. In 1908, he became vicar of Calvary Church in Sioux Falls, South Dakota, while in 1909, when the church became a cathedral, he was installed as its first dean.

Bishop
On April 11, 1912, Biller was elected Missionary Bishop of South Dakota on the third ballot, and was consecrated on September 18, 1912, by Presiding Bishop Daniel S. Tuttle. He died suddenly a few years later on October 22, 1915.

References 

The Living Church Annual, 1916, p. 652.

1874 births
1915 deaths
19th-century American Episcopalians
Berkeley Divinity School alumni
Episcopal bishops of South Dakota
Clergy from London
English emigrants to the United States